was a mid-station along the Nakasendō in Edo period Japan. It was in between the post stations of Unuma-juku and Kanō-juku. It is located in the present-day town of Kakamigahara, Gifu Prefecture, Japan.

Neighboring post towns
Nakasendō
Unuma-juku - Shinkanō-shuku - Kanō-juku

References

Post stations in Gifu Prefecture
Stations of the Nakasendō